Doddasiddavvanahalli  is a village in the southern state of Karnataka, India. It is located in the Chitradurga taluk of Chitradurga district in Karnataka. It is besides NH4, 6 miles from before Chitradurga city.

Demographics
As of 2001 India census, Doddasiddavvanahalli had a population of 6766 with 3423 males and 3343 females.

The famous Ex. Chief Minister S.Nijalingappa is also from this village.

Famous people
S.Nijalingappa (Siddavvanahalli Nijalingappa )(Vinayak) - politician, ex-CM, ex-MP and ex AICC President

See also
 Chitradurga
 Districts of Karnataka

References

External links
 http://Chitradurga.nic.in/

Villages in Chitradurga district